Spight is a surname. Notable people with the surname include:

Alexis Spight (born 1993), American urban contemporary gospel musician
Thomas Spight (1841–1924), American politician

See also
Spite (disambiguation)